The Light Princess (Original Cast Recording) is the commercial music release from the stage adaptation of the Scottish fairy tale by George MacDonald.

The Light Princess was the first stage musical to feature original compositions by singer-songwriter Tori Amos. The play debuted at London's Royal National Theatre on 9 October 2013 with music and lyrics by Amos, book and lyrics by Australian playwright and screenwriter Samuel Adamson and orchestrations by John Philip Shenale.

The story centres around teenage princess Althea of Lagobel who lost gravity when refusing to mourn over her mother’s death and is therefore bound to float above ground. When war breaks out Althea, pushed by her father to come to ground and take responsibility, flees only to fall in love with the rivalling kingdoms prince.

The musical opened to positive reviews in September 2013, starring Rosalie Craig in the titular role, subsequently singled out as a stand-out performance. Craig was nominated for many awards, and ultimately won the Evening Standard's award for best actress in a musical. The choreography, lighting, set design, music (Amos) and other cast performances were also lauded and nominated for a range of awards. In 2014, Amos stated that the production team had ambitions of bringing The Light Princess to American Broadway, but expressed worry that the original National Theatre production might not be commercial enough for the American audience.

The  Original Cast Recording features 30 original recordings by the cast plus three bonus tracks, including two performed by Amos.

An early incarnation of the song "Coronation" appeared on Tori Amos's seasonal album Midwinter Graces in 2009. Then known as "Winter's Carol", much of the song's core melody remains the same as the version that would become "Coronation". In its place as the closing number of The Light Princess, the lyrics, structure and arrangements have been almost completely re-written, though some lyrical content remains similar to "Winter's Carol".

Track listing

Charts

References

2015 soundtrack albums
Theatre soundtracks
Cast recordings
George MacDonald